Sir Russell Coutts  (born 1 March 1962) is a world champion New Zealand yachtsman.

Early and personal life 
Coutts was educated at Otago Boys' High School (1975–1979) and is a Life Member of Paremata Boating Club, where he learnt to sail in a P class, and the Ravensbourne Boating Club. Coutts has three children, and has been married twice.

In 2021 Coutts criticised the New Zealand Government's response to COVID-19, suggesting that the government was acting like a dictatorship by establishing vaccine mandates and enforcing managed isolation. In February 2022 Coutts announced that he would attend the Convoy 2022 New Zealand anti-mandate protest in Wellington.

Career 
Coutts' achievements include a gold medal in the Finn Class in the 1984 Olympic Games, winning the America's Cup five times, the ISAF World Youth championships, three World Match Racing Championships, numerous international match race wins and IOR, IMS and One Design World Championship victories. As skipper/helmsman in America's cup racing, he has a perfect record with 15 wins and no losses (1995, 2000, 2003). He was CEO of the Oracle Team when it won the America's Cup twice with 14 wins and 16 losses (2010, 2013 and 2017 each time with James Spithill as skipper/helmsman).

In 2005 Slovenian designer Andrej Justin designed with input from him a new boat called the RC44; a high performance one design racer created for top level racing in international regattas under strictly controlled Class Rules. The concept and the design features of the RC44 are dedicated to the amateur helmsmen racing in fleet racing sailing events.

In July 2007, Coutts was named CEO and Skipper of BMW Oracle Racing, sponsored by Golden Gate Yacht Club (GGYC), the United States Challenger to the 2010 America's Cup. He was involved in the pre-match litigation between the challengers Golden Gate Yacht Club and Société Nautique de Genève (SNG), in which the court decided that the GGYC was the rightful Challenger of Record. Cup Defender SNG's team was Alinghi. Coutts' yacht USA beat the defending yacht Alinghi 5 by considerable margins in both races.

Most observers stated that USA 17's rigid wing sail had given it a decisive advantage.

Coutts again led the Oracle Team as CEO in the next America's Cup match against Emirates Team New Zealand. This match took place in the bay of San Francisco in September 2013. Oracle managed to come back from 8 races to 1 by winning the following 8 races and to defend the cup in the longest America's cup match ever. Both skipper James Spithill and team owner Larry Ellison praised Coutts' role in the defense of the oldest trophy in sports history.

Achievements

1981 – ISAF World Youth Champion / Winner
1984 – 1984 Olympic Games / Los Angeles / Finn Class / Gold Medal
1992 – World Champion / Match Racing
1993 – World Champion / Match Racing           – Admiral's Cup / Pinta / /Winner
1994 – World Champion / Match Racing
1995 – 1995 Louis Vuitton Cup / Black Magic / San Diego / Winner (37 victories, 1 loss) – Skipper & Helmsman
/>           – 1995 America's Cup / Black Magic (Challenger) / San Diego / Winner (5 to 0) – Skipper & Helmsman
1996 – World Champion / Match Racing
2000 – 2000 America’s Cup / Team New Zealand (Defender) / Auckland / Winner (5 to 0) – Skipper & Helmsman
2001 – World Champion / 12 metre JI / Cowes           – World Champion / Farr 40 / Southampton, UK
2003 – 2003 Louis Vuitton Cup / Alinghi / Auckland / Winner (30 victories, 4 losses) – Skipper & Helmsman           – 2003 America's Cup / Alinghi (Challenger) / Auckland / Winner (5 to 0) – Skipper & Helmsman
2006 – Bol d'Or Rolex / Decision 35 / Team Banque Gonet / Switzerland / Winner           – World Champion / Farr 40 / Vincenzo Onorato Team / Newport, U.S.
2007 – World Champion / TP 52 / Team Artemis
2008 – Cagliari RC44 Cup, Match Racing / RC44 / BMW ORACLE Racing / Cagliari, Italy / Winner            – TP 52 Audi MedCup / TP 52 / Team USA 17 / Winner           – Malcesine SLAM Cup, Match Racing / RC44 / BMW ORACLE Racing / Malcesine, Italy / Winner
2010 2010 America's Cup / BMW Oracle Racing (Challenger) / Valencia / Winner (2 to 0) – Team Chief Executive Officer
2013 2013 America's Cup / Oracle Racing (Defender) / San Francisco, USA / Winner (9 to 8) – Team Chief Executive Officer

Awards
In New Zealand, Coutts has been honoured with appointment as a Member of the Order of the British Empire in the 1985 New Year Honours and then elevation to the rank of Commander of the Order of the British Empire in the 1995 Queen's Birthday Honours.

He was made a Distinguished Companion of the New Zealand Order of Merit in the 2000 Queen's Birthday Honours, and redesignated as a Knight Companion of the New Zealand Order of Merit in August 2009. He has been named ISAF Sailor of the Year twice.

Other awards include:
 1984 – New Zealand Yachtsman of the Year
 1994 – Silbernes Lorbeerblatt, German National Award
 1995 – Sperry World Sailor of the Year
 1995 – Halberg Award
 1995 – ISAF World Sailor of the Year Award
 1996 – America's Cup Hall of Fame
 1996 – World Trophy for Oceania
 2003 – ISAF Rolex World Sailor of the Year Award

References

External links

 
 
 
 Profile, nzherald.co.nz; accessed 24 April 2016.
 Sir Russell Coutts lobbied for Dean Barker to be in Team Japan mix for next America's Cup, stuff.co.nz;  accessed 24 April 2016.
 Sir Russell Coutts bars former Kiwi team-mate from America's Cup meeting in London, independent.co.uk; accessed 24 April 2016.

ISAF World Sailor of the Year (male)
1962 births
Team New Zealand sailors
Oracle Racing sailors
New Zealand Commanders of the Order of the British Empire
People educated at Otago Boys' High School
Knights Companion of the New Zealand Order of Merit
Living people
New Zealand male sailors (sport)
Olympic gold medalists for New Zealand in sailing
Sailors at the 1984 Summer Olympics – Finn
Sailors at the 1992 Summer Olympics – Soling
People in sports awarded knighthoods
University of Auckland alumni
Alinghi sailors
Etchells class sailors
Medalists at the 1984 Summer Olympics
2003 America's Cup sailors
2000 America's Cup sailors
1995 America's Cup sailors
1992 America's Cup sailors
Farr 40 class world champions
World champions in sailing for New Zealand
SailGP